The 1940 United States presidential election in Mississippi took place on November 5, 1940, as part of the 1940 United States presidential election. Mississippi voters chose nine representatives, or electors, to the Electoral College, who voted for president and vice president.

Mississippi was won by incumbent President Franklin D. Roosevelt (D–New York), running with Secretary Henry A. Wallace, with 95.70% of the popular vote, against Wendell Willkie (R–New York), running with Minority Leader Charles L. McNary, with 4.19% of the popular vote.

By percentage of the popular vote won, Mississippi was the most lopsided contest in the nation, with a margin of over 91% for Roosevelt.

Results

Results by county

References

Mississippi
1940
1940 Mississippi elections